Nihilumbra is a puzzle-platform game developed by Spanish video game developer BeautiFun Games. The game was first released for iOS in June 2012, and it has been translated to seven languages.

Gameplay
Nihilumbra is played as a standard platform game, by controlling Born as he walks and jumps across the game's levels. There are multiple enemies that the player needs to avoid since, at first, there is no way to defeat them. The game is divided into the five worlds that Born explores. In each of them, the player is granted a new colour, with which the player can paint on the terrain (by touching the screen) to modify the behaviour of the environment.
 In the Frozen Cliffs Born receives the blue colour, that makes surfaces slippery.
 In the Living Forest the green colour is obtained, from which objects bounce off.
 In the Ash Desert the brown colour is obtained, whose ability is to make surfaces sticky and slower to walk on.
 In the Volcano, the player is given red, that can make objects and monsters burn.
 In The City, Born receives yellow, the last colour in the game, that is able to conduct electricity to a variety of devices.

Reception
Since its release, Nihilumbra has received generally positive reviews, with an aggregate review score of 86 at Metacritic (based on 12 critics), of 85.71% at GameRankings (based on 7 reviews), and 8/10 at ComboCaster. With an aggregate score of 86, the iOS version of Nihilumbra is the second-highest-rated Spanish game listed on Metacritic.

Other versions
A Wii U version, that was first announced on the August 2013 Nintendo Direct Europe, was released on May 14, 2015. A Nintendo Switch version was released in May 2018 and available through the Nintendo Store.

A PC version was made available via Steam Greenlight. A remastered version of Nihilumbra was released on September 25, 2013 for Microsoft Windows, macOS and Linux, with updated graphics and soundtrack and voice acting for the narration.

Nihilumbra was released as part of the PlayStation Plus January 2016 offering on the PlayStation Vita. While this version used the joypad and keys, it offered the touchscreen as alternative control methods.

References

External links
 

2012 video games
IOS games
Puzzle-platform games
Nintendo Switch games
Single-player video games
Video games developed in Spain
Windows games
Android (operating system) games
MacOS games
Linux games
PlayStation Vita games
Wii U eShop games
Video games with silhouette graphics